was a Japanese Buddhist monk and businessman credited with founding the eponymous Sumitomo Group. He was an 8th generation descendant of Sumitomo Tadashige. Sumitomo Tadashige said to be 22nd generation descendant of Taira no Takamochi from Kanmu Heishi clan who was a grandson of 50th Emperor of Japan, Emperor Kanmu. Originally, he was a Buddhist monk. During his lifetime, there were mainly two sects of Buddhist monks in Japan. Masatomo belonged to one of the two which later ceased to exist. Reluctant to join the other group of Buddhist monks, he turned to business to make a living. He started his business by selling books and medicines at first in a bookshop in Kyoto circa 1615.

References

1585 births
1652 deaths
16th-century Japanese people
Japanese company founders
Muromachi period Buddhist clergy
People from Fukui Prefecture
People of Muromachi-period Japan